The Two Orphans is a 1976 Italian-Spanish historical drama film directed by Leopoldo Savona and starring Isabella Savona, Patrizia Gori and Andrés Resino. It is based on the play The Two Orphans by Adolphe d'Ennery and Eugène Cormon.

Cast

See also
 Orphans of the Storm (1921)
 The Two Orphans (1933)
 The Two Orphans (1942)
 The Two Orphans (1954)
 The Two Orphans (1965)

References

Bibliography 
 Klossner, Michael. The Europe of 1500-1815 on Film and Television. McFarland, 2002.

External links 
 

1976 films
Italian historical drama films
Spanish historical drama films
1970s historical drama films
1970s Italian-language films
Films directed by Leopoldo Savona
Films scored by Stelvio Cipriani
Films about orphans
Italian films based on plays
Films set in Paris
French Revolution films
1976 drama films
1970s Italian films